The M1944 Hyde Carbine was an attempt by George Hyde to manufacture a light rifle for the US Armed Forces. The overall weapon was based on the Thompson Submachine Gun, which Hyde drew inspiration from in many of his weapon designs.

An original .30 Carbine based on the M1921/27 variants, it worked well but due to the war, the effort was expensive for mass production and its weight defied the concept of a 'Light Rifle'.

The M1944 Hyde Carbine came with a quick barrel change device similar to the MG42 and used pressed steel components to ease production and reduce weight, therefore, making it versatile, reliable and easier to carry.

Overview 

The M1944 Hyde sub-machine gun came with an uncommon quick-change barrel system that was most likely copied from the German MG42.  This kind of engineering was uncommon because it was tremendously complicated and expensive in a firearm that was largely supposed to be produced as cheaply and quickly as possible. The bolt has a sort of rat-tail, similar to the Solothurn MP-34, where the spring is contained within the buttstock. 

Photos of the Hyde gun appear in the first edition of The World’s Assault Rifles by Daniel Musgrave and Thomas B. Nelson, published in 1967. No known examples of the M1944 Hyde Carbine remain in existence.

Related equipment and accessories

Ammunition types 

The ammunition used by the military with the carbine include:
 Cartridge, Caliber .30, Carbine, Ball, M1
 Cartridge, Grenade, Caliber .30, M6 (also authorized for other blank firing uses, due to a lack of a dedicated blank cartridge)
 Cartridge, Caliber .30, Carbine, Dummy, M13
 Cartridge, Caliber .30, Carbine, Ball, Test, High Pressure, M18
 Cartridge, Caliber .30, Carbine, Tracer, M16 (also rated as having an incendiary effect)
 Cartridge, Caliber .30, Carbine, Tracer, M27 (dimmer illumination and no incendiary effect)

See also 
 Carbine, Cal .30, M1A1 (based on Winchester M1 Carbine)
 List of U.S. Army weapons by supply catalog designation SNL B-28
 List of individual weapons of the U.S. Armed Forces

References

External links 
M1944 Hyde Carbine

.30 Carbine firearms
Rifles of the United States
Trial and research firearms of the United States